The 1956–57 SM-sarja season was the 26th season of the SM-sarja, the top level of ice hockey in Finland. 10 teams participated in the league, and Ilves Tampere won the championship.

Regular season

Group A

Group B

Qualification for final 
 TPS Turku - Tappara Tampere 8:1

3rd place
 Tarmo Hämeenlinna - Tappara Tampere 1:6/3:1

Final 
 Ilves Tampere - TPS Turku 4:2/7:5

External links
 Season on hockeyarchives.info

Fin
Liiga seasons
1956–57 in Finnish ice hockey